Qari Bakhtiar Muaz is an Afghan Taliban politician who is currently serving as governor of Baghlan Province since 7 November 2021.

References

Living people
Taliban governors
Governors of Baghlan Province
Year of birth missing (living people)